Hammer og Hosanger was an administrative entity in Hordaland county, Norway.

It was an electoral district up to and including the Norwegian parliamentary election, 1882, whence electors were sent to a countywide electoral college. Ahead of the Norwegian parliamentary election, 1885 Alversund was demerged as its own electoral district.

Correspondingly, Alversund was demerged as its own bailiff district on 1 January 1887.

It has also been claimed that Hammer og Hosanger was a municipality from 1837 to January 1, 1885. Hosanger and Hammer were actually different municipalities; from Hosanger, Modalen was split in 1910, and from Hammer, Alversund was split in 1885 (and from it Meland in 1923) and Åsane in 1904.

References

Former electoral districts of Norway